The Thailand Golf Championship was a golf tournament on the Asian Tour. It was played for the first time in December 2011 at the Amata Spring Country Club in Bangkok, Thailand. The purse in 2015 was US$1,000,000. For its whole existence, it was the flagship event of the Asian Tour, with a guaranteed minimum of 20 Official World Golf Ranking points for the winner, compared to a minimum of 14 for other events.

Winners

References

External links

Coverage on the Asian Tour's official site

Former Asian Tour events
Golf tournaments in Thailand
Recurring sporting events established in 2011
Recurring sporting events disestablished in 2015
2011 establishments in Thailand
2015 disestablishments in Thailand